Brothers Moving is a Danish band formed in New York City in 2008 by brothers Esben Knoblauch (lead vocals, guitar, kazoo), Aske Knoblauch (lead vocals, lead guitar) and Simon Knoblauch (cajón) along with Nils Sørensen (Bass (instrument)). They are regarded as one of the most influential street bands in the past few years, and considered early pioneers of using the cajón drum as a replacement for a full drum kit. The quartet is known for mixing genres and singing in both English and Danish, and their musical style is inspired by blues, funk, reggae, folk and early rock and roll.

Career
While Brothers Moving stuck to their roots and independence as street musicians, they quickly began gigging regularly in smaller clubs, at private parties and at fashion events in and around New York City.

In 2009 they passed auditions for the MUNY (Music Under New York) membership.

Although Brothers Moving received little attention in their home country, the band's popularity has grown in other places. This is in large part due to a video filmed on a cellphone by a spectator in Union Square, NY, which captured the band performing the Cab Calloway classic "Minnie the Moocher" during one of their street sets. In 2016 they headlined their debut concerts in Moscow and Saint Petersburg, which appeared to sell out and were well received by the public. Later that same year, Brothers Moving also performed at Fusion Festival in Germany, and at Stereoleto Festival in Saint Petersburg.

Brothers Moving's self-titled debut album was recorded in the spring of 2012, and released independently on July 18, 2012. The album contained mainly songs from their street set, along with a few original compositions.

They have continued to release singles and albums, releasing their second album, Autonomy, in 2018, and a single, "Keep on talking to yourself," in 2020.

Discography

Studio albums
 2018: Autonomy (Self-Released)
 2012: Brothers Moving (Self-Released)

Live releases
 2008: Live @ Hudson River (Currently Unavailable)
 2009: Live @ Roots Cafe (Currently Unavailable)

EPs and singles
 2012: Sorte Sigøjner (Self-Released)
 2012: Train (Self-Released)
2022: “Choppin’”
2022: “Pickin’”

References

Danish indie rock groups
Musical groups from New York (state)
Danish musical groups